Taketsugu Asazaka (born 24 July 1930) is a Japanese speed skater. He competed in four events at the 1956 Winter Olympics.

References

External links
 

1930 births
Possibly living people
Japanese male speed skaters
Olympic speed skaters of Japan
Speed skaters at the 1956 Winter Olympics
Sportspeople from Aomori Prefecture
20th-century Japanese people